Çahar (also, Chakhar) is a village and municipality in the Imishli Rayon of Azerbaijan.  It has a population of 1,156.

References 

Populated places in Imishli District